High-speed rail (HSR) is a type of rail system that runs significantly faster than traditional rail, using an integrated system of specialised rolling stock and dedicated tracks.

The first high-speed rail system, the Tōkaidō Shinkansen, began operations in Japan in 1964. The system also became known by its English nickname the bullet train. Japan's example was followed by several European countries, initially in France and Germany, and later also in Spain, Italy, and others. Today Europe has an extensive network with numerous international connections. More recent construction since the 21st century has led to China taking a leading role in high-speed rail. , its network accounted for over two-thirds of the world's total.

In addition to these, many other countries have developed high-speed rail infrastructure to connect major cities, including Austria, Belgium, Denmark, Finland, Indonesia, Japan, Morocco, the Netherlands, Norway, Poland, Portugal, Russia, Saudi Arabia, Serbia, South Korea, Sweden, Switzerland, Taiwan, Turkey, the United Kingdom, the United States, and Uzbekistan. Only in continental Europe and Asia does high-speed rail cross international borders.

High-speed trains mostly operate on standard gauge tracks of continuously welded rail on grade-separated rights of way with large radii. However, certain regions with wider legacy railways, including Russia and Uzbekistan, have sought to develop a high speed railway network in Russian gauge. There are no narrow gauge high-speed trains.

High-speed rail is the fastest and most efficient ground-based method of commercial transportation, however due to requirements for large track curves, gentle gradients and grade separated track the construction of high-speed rail is more costly than conventional rail and therefore does not always present an economical advantage over conventional speed rail.

Definitions

Multiple definitions for high-speed rail are in use worldwide.

The European Union Directive 96/48/EC, Annex 1 (see also Trans-European high-speed rail network) defines high-speed rail in terms of:
 Infrastructure Track built specially for high-speed travel or specially upgraded for high-speed travel.
This must apply to at least one section of the line. Rolling stock must be able to reach a speed of at least 200 km/h to be considered high speed.
 Operating conditions Rolling stock must be designed alongside its infrastructure for complete compatibility, safety and quality of service.

The International Union of Railways (UIC) identifies three categories of high-speed rail:
 Category I New tracks specially constructed for high speeds, allowing a maximum running speed of at least .
 Category II Existing tracks specially upgraded for high speeds, allowing a maximum running speed of at least .
 Category III Existing tracks specially upgraded for high speeds, allowing a maximum running speed of at least 200 km/h, but with some sections having a lower allowable speed (for example due to topographic constraints, or passage through urban areas).

A third definition of high-speed and very high-speed rail (Demiridis & Pyrgidis 2012) requires simultaneous fulfilment of the following two conditions:

The UIC prefers to use "definitions" (plural) because they consider that there is no single standard definition of high-speed rail, nor even standard usage of the terms ("high speed", or "very high speed"). They make use of the European EC Directive 96/48, stating that high speed is a combination of all the elements which constitute the system: infrastructure, rolling stock and operating conditions. The International Union of Railways states that high-speed rail is a set of unique features, not merely a train travelling above a particular speed. Many conventionally hauled trains are able to reach  in commercial service but are not considered to be high-speed trains. These include the French SNCF Intercités and German DB IC.

Above those speeds positive train control or the European Train Control System becomes necessary or legally mandatory.

National domestic standards may vary from the international ones.

History
Railways were the first form of rapid land transportation and had an effective monopoly on long-distance passenger traffic until the development of the motor car and airliners in the early-mid 20th century. Speed had always been an important factor for railroads and they constantly tried to achieve higher speeds and decrease journey times.

Early research

First experiments
High-speed rail development began in Germany in 1899 when the Prussian state railway joined with ten electrical and engineering firms and electrified  of military owned railway between Marienfelde and Zossen. The line used three-phase current at 10 kilovolts and 45 Hz.

The Van der Zypen & Charlier company of Deutz, Cologne built two railcars, one fitted with electrical equipment from Siemens-Halske, the second with equipment from Allgemeine Elektrizitäts-Gesellschaft (AEG), that were tested on the Marienfelde–Zossen line during 1902 and 1903 (see Experimental three-phase railcar).

These trains demonstrated the feasibility of electric high-speed rail; however, regularly scheduled electric high-speed rail travel was still more than 30 years away.

High-speed aspirations
After the breakthrough of electric railroads, it was clearly the infrastructure – especially the cost of it – which hampered the introduction of high-speed rail. Several disasters happened – derailments, head-on collisions on single-track lines, collisions with road traffic at grade crossings, etc. The physical laws were well-known, i.e. if the speed was doubled, the curve radius should be quadrupled; the same was true for the acceleration and braking distances.

Alexander C. Miller had greater ambitions. In 1906, he launched the Chicago-New York Electric Air Line Railroad project to reduce the running time between the two big cities to ten hours by using electric  locomotives. A part of the line is still used as one of the last interurbans in the US.

High-speed interurbans
In the US, some of the interurbans (i.e. trams or streetcars which run from city to city) of the early 20th century were very high-speed for their time (also Europe had and still does have some interurbans). Several high-speed rail technologies have their origin in the interurban field.

In 1903 – 30 years before the conventional railways started to streamline their trains – the officials of the Louisiana Purchase Exposition organised the Electric Railway Test Commission to conduct a series of tests to develop a carbody design that would reduce wind resistance at high speeds. A long series of tests was carried. In 1905, St. Louis Car Company built a railcar for the traction magnate Henry E. Huntington, capable of speeds approaching . However, it was too heavy for much of the tracks, so Cincinnati Car Company, J. G. Brill and others pioneered lightweight constructions, use of aluminium alloys, and low-level bogies which could operate smoothly at extremely high speeds on rough interurban tracks. Westinghouse and General Electric designed motors compact enough to be mounted on the bogies. The Red Devils weighed only 22 tons though they could seat 44 passengers.

Extensive wind tunnel research – the first in the railway industry – was done before J. G. Brill in 1931 built the Bullet cars for Philadelphia and Western Railroad (P&W). Some of them were almost 60 years in service. P&W's Norristown High Speed Line is still in use, almost 110 years after P&W in 1907 opened their double-track Upper Darby–Strafford line without a single grade crossing with roads or other railways. The entire line was governed by an absolute block signal system.

Early German high-speed network

This train was a streamlined multi-powered unit, albeit diesel, and used Jakobs bogies.

Incidentally no train service since the cancelation of this express train in 1939 has traveled between the two cities in a faster time . In August 2019, the travel time between Dresden-Neustadt and Berlin-Südkreuz was 102 minutes. See Berlin–Dresden railway.

Further development allowed the usage of these "Fliegenden Züge" (flying trains) on a rail network across Germany.
The "Diesel-Schnelltriebwagen-Netz" (diesel high-speed-vehicle network) had been in the planning since 1934 but it never reached its envisaged size.

All high-speed service stopped in August 1939 shortly before the outbreak of World War II.

American Streamliners

The Zephyr was made of stainless steel and, like the Fliegender Hamburger, was diesel powered, articulated with Jacobs bogies, and could reach  as commercial speed.

The new service was inaugurated 11 November 1934, traveling between Kansas City and Lincoln, but at a lower speed than the record, on average speed .

The S1 engine was assigned to power the popular all-coach overnight premier train the Trail Blazer between New York and Chicago since the late 1940s and it consistently reached  in its service life. These were the last "high-speed" trains to use steam power.

Many of these streamliners posted travel times comparable to or even better than their modern Amtrak successors, which are limited to  top speed on most of the network.

Italian electric and the last steam record

The external combustion engines and boilers on steam locomotives were large, heavy and time and labor-intensive to maintain, and the days of steam for high speed were numbered.

Introduction of the Talgo system
In 1945, a Spanish engineer, Alejandro Goicoechea, developed a streamlined, articulated train that was able to run on existing tracks at higher speeds than contemporary passenger trains. This was achieved by providing the locomotive and cars with a unique axle system that used one axle set per car end, connected by a Y-bar coupler. Amongst other advantages, the centre of mass was only half as high as usual. This system became famous under the name of Talgo (Tren Articulado Ligero Goicoechea Oriol), and for half a century was the main Spanish provider of high-speed trains.

First above 300 km/h developments

In the early 1950s, the French National Railway started to receive their new powerful CC 7100 electric locomotives, and began to study and evaluate running at higher speeds. In 1954, the CC 7121 hauling a full train achieved a record  during a test on standard track. For the first time,  was surpassed, allowing the idea of higher-speed services to be developed and further engineering studies commenced. Especially, during the 1955 records, a dangerous hunting oscillation, the swaying of the bogies which leads to dynamic instability and potential derailment was discovered. This problem was solved by yaw dampers which enabled safe running at high speeds today. Research was also made about "current harnessing" at high-speed by the pantographs, which was solved 20 years later by the Zébulon TGV's prototype.

Breakthrough: Shinkansen

Japanese research and development
With some 45 million people living in the densely populated Tokyo–Osaka corridor, congestion on road and rail became a serious problem after World War II, and the Japanese government began thinking seriously about a new high-speed rail service.

Japan in the 1950s was a populous, resource-limited nation that for security reasons did not want to import petroleum, but needed a way to transport its millions of people in and between cities.

Japanese National Railways (JNR) engineers then began to study the development of a high-speed regular mass transit service. In 1955, they were present at the Lille's Electrotechnology Congress in France, and during a 6-month visit, the head engineer of JNR accompanied the deputy director Marcel Tessier at the DETE (SNCF Electric traction study department). JNR engineers returned to Japan with a number of ideas and technologies they would use on their future trains, including alternating current for rail traction, and international standard gauge.

First narrow-gauge Japanese high-speed service
In 1957, the engineers at the private Odakyu Electric Railway in Greater Tokyo Area launched the Odakyu 3000 series SE EMU. Conventional Japanese railways up until that point had largely been built in the  Cape gauge, however widening the tracks to standard gauge  would make very high-speed rail much simpler due to improved stability of the wider rail gauge, and thus standard gauge was adopted for high-speed service. With the sole exceptions of Russia, Finland, and Uzbekistan all high-speed rail lines in the world are still standard gauge, even in countries where the preferred gauge for legacy lines is different.

A new train on a new line

After initial feasibility tests, the plan was fast-tracked and construction of the first section of the line started on 20 April 1959. Five years after the beginning of the construction work, in October 1964, just in time for the Olympic Games, the first modern high-speed rail, the Tōkaidō Shinkansen, was opened between the two cities; a 320-mile stretch between  Tokyo and Ōsaka. As a result of its speeds, the Shinkansen earned international publicity and praise, and it was dubbed the "bullet train."

The first Shinkansen trains, the 0 Series Shinkansen, built by Kawasaki Heavy Industries—in English often called "Bullet Trains", after the original Japanese name —outclassed the earlier fast trains in commercial service.

High-speed rail for the masses
Speed was not only a part of the Shinkansen revolution: the Shinkansen offered high-speed rail travel to the masses. The first Bullet trains had 12 cars and later versions had up to 16, and double-deck trains further increased the capacity.

After three years, more than 100 million passengers had used the trains, and the milestone of the first one billion passengers was reached in 1976. The cumulative patronage on the entire system since 1964 is over 10 billion, the equivalent of approximately 140% of the world's population, without a single train passenger fatality. (Suicides, passengers falling off the platforms, and industrial accidents have resulted in fatalities.)

Since their introduction, Japan's Shinkansen systems have been undergoing constant improvement, not only increasing line speeds. Over a dozen train models have been produced, addressing diverse issues such as tunnel boom noise, vibration, aerodynamic drag, lines with lower patronage ("Mini shinkansen"), earthquake and typhoon safety, braking distance, problems due to snow, and energy consumption (newer trains are twice as energy-efficient as the initial ones despite greater speeds).

Future developments

After decades of research and successful testing on a  test track, JR Central is now constructing a Maglev Shinkansen line, which is known as the Chūō Shinkansen. These Maglev trains still have the traditional underlying tracks and the cars have wheels. This serves a practical purpose at stations and a safety purpose out on the lines in the event of a power failure. However, in normal operation, the wheels are raised up into the car as the train reaches certain speeds where the magnetic levitation effect takes over. 
It will link Tokyo and Osaka by 2037, with the section from Tokyo to Nagoya expected to be operational by 2027. The first generation train can be ridden by tourists visiting the test track.

China is developing two separate high speed maglev systems. 
 the CRRC 600, is based on the Transrapid technology and is being developed by the CRRC under license from Thyssen-Krupp. A  test track has been operating since 2006 at the Jiading Campus of Tongji University, northwest of Shanghai.  A prototype vehicle was developed in 2019 and was tested in June 2020. In July 2021 a four car train was unveiled. A high speed test track is under development and in April 2021 there was consideration given to re-opening the Emsland test facility in Germany.
A prototype was demonstrated in January 2021 on a  test track.

Europe and North America

First demonstrations at  
The same year the Aérotrain, a French hovercraft monorail train prototype, reached  within days of operation.

Le Capitole

Some improvements were set, notably the signals system, development of on board "in-cab" signalling system, and curve revision.

At the same time, the Aérotrain prototype 02 reached  on a half-scale experimental track. In 1969, it achieved  on the same track. On 5 March 1974, the full-scale commercial prototype Aérotrain I80HV, jet powered, reached .

US Metroliner trains

In the United States, following the creation of Japan's first high-speed Shinkansen, President Lyndon B. Johnson as part of his Great Society infrastructure building initiatives asked the Congress to devise a way to increase speeds on the railroads.

United Kingdom, Italy and Germany

In 1976, British Rail introduced a high-speed service able to reach  using the InterCity 125 diesel-electric trainsets under the brand name of High Speed Train (HST). It was the fastest diesel-powered train in regular service and it improved upon its  forerunners in speed and acceleration. As of 2019 it is still the fastest diesel-powered train regular service. The train was as a reversible multi-car set having driving power-cars at both ends and a fixed formation of passenger cars between them. Journey times were reduced by an hour for example on the East Coast Main Line, and passenger numbers increased.. As of 2019 many of these trains are still in service, private operators have often preferred to rebuild the units with new engines rather than replace them.

In France this year also saw the abandonment for political reasons of the Aérotrain project, in favour of the TGV.

Evolution in Europe

France 

Following the 1955 records, two divisions of the SNCF began to study high-speed services. In 1964, the DETMT (petrol-engine traction studies department of SNCF) investigated the use of gas turbines: a diesel-powered railcar was modified with a gas-turbine, and was called "TGV" (Turbotrain Grande Vitesse). It reached  in 1967, and served as a basis for the future Turbotrain and the real TGV. At the same time, the new "SNCF Research Department", created in 1966, was studying various projects, including one code-named "C03: Railways possibilities on new infrastructure (tracks)".

In 1969, the "C03 project" was transferred to public administration while a contract with Alstom was signed for the construction of two gas-turbine high-speed train prototypes, named "TGV 001". The prototype consisted of a set of five carriages, plus a power car at each end, both powered by two gas-turbine engines. The sets used Jacobs bogies, which reduce drag and increase safety.

It used gas-turbine powered multiple elements and was the basis for future experimentation with TGV services, including shuttle services and regular high rate schedules.

In 1971, the "C03" project, now known as "TGV Sud-Est", was validated by the government, against Bertin's Aerotrain. Until this date, there was a rivalry between the French Land Settlement Commission (DATAR), supporting the Aérotrain, and the SNCF and its ministry, supporting conventional rail. At that time, the classic Paris-Lyon line was already congested and a new line was required; this busy corridor, neither too short (where high speeds give limited reductions in end to end times) nor too long (where planes are faster in city center to city center travel time), was the best choice for the new service.

The 1973 oil crisis substantially increased oil prices. In the continuity of the De Gaulle "energy self-sufficiency" and nuclear-energy policy, a ministry decision switched the future TGV from now costly gas-turbine to full electric energy in 1974.

After intensive tests with the gas-turbine "TGV 001" prototype, and the electric "Zébulon", in 1977, the SNCF placed an order to the group Alstom–Francorail–MTE for 87 TGV Sud-Est trainsets.
They used the "TGV 001" concept, with a permanently coupled set of eight cars, sharing Jacobs bogies, and hauled by two electric-power cars, one at each end.

In 1981, the first section of the new Paris–Lyon High-Speed line was inaugurated, with a  top speed (then  soon after). Being able to use both dedicated high-speed and conventional lines, the TGV offered the ability to join every city in the country at shorter journey times. After the introduction of the TGV on some routes, air traffic on these routes decreased and in some cases disappeared.

Germany 

The German ICE train was similar to the TGV, with dedicated streamlined power cars at both ends, but a variable number of trailers between them. Unlike the TGV, the trailers had two conventional bogies per car, and could be uncoupled, allowing the train to be lengthened or shortened. This introduction was the result of ten years of study with the ICE-V prototype, originally called Intercity Experimental, which broke the world speed record in 1988, reaching .

Italy 

The earliest European high-speed railway to be built was the Italian Florence–Rome high-speed railway (also called "Direttissima"). The railway was built between 1978 and 1992 and was served by trains pulled by FS Class E444 3 kV DC locomotives. However, it was not until the late 1980s that a more complete high-speed rail network was planned. The initial project envisaged the development of the network on two main axes: the Turin-Trieste one and the Milan-Salerno via Rome one. In the meantime new sections have been planned, such as the Turin-Lyon high speed railway, which includes the construction of the international Mont d'Ambin Base tunnel, Naples-Bari, Milan-Genoa, Salerno-Reggio Calabria and Palermo-Catania-Messina (in Sicily) as the main work; these last two sections could be connected following a possible construction of the Strait of Messina Bridge.

In Italy, the characteristics of high-speed lines are rather unique. In fact, the network was conceived with the aim of "high capacity" (in Italian "alta capacità"), in addition to that of "high speed". The "high capacity" consists of a series of technical characteristics (in particular concerning the monitoring of railway traffic and the increase in the capacity of the tracks) that allow the passage of freight at high speed. This last characteristic (also present in China, but with different technologies) and the characteristics of the particularly mountainous territory of the Italian peninsula have caused a very high increase in construction costs (20/68 million € per km). Furthermore, unlike the networks of other countries, such as France, the high-speed railways have been built completely independently from the normal networks, following very straight and linear trajectories. Only in the development of more recent lines (like the Napoli-Bari or the Palermo-Catania-Messina) it was preferred to intervene on existing lines, speeding them up by increasing their performance with more linear deviations.

The trains services on the high-speed lines in Italy are the Frecciarossa, the Frecciargento and the Italo (the latter of the private company Nuovo Trasporto Viaggiatori).

Spain 

In 1992, just in time for the Barcelona Olympic Games and Seville Expo '92, the Madrid–Seville high-speed rail line opened in Spain with 25 kV AC electrification, and standard gauge, differing from all other Spanish lines which used Iberian gauge. This allowed the AVE rail service to begin operations using Class 100 trainsets built by Alstom, directly derived in design from the French TGV trains. The service was very popular and development continued on high-speed rail in Spain.

In 2005, the Spanish Government announced an ambitious plan, (PEIT 2005–2020) envisioning that by 2020, 90 percent of the population would live within  of a station served by AVE. Spain began building the largest HSR network in Europe: , five of the new lines have opened (Madrid–Zaragoza–Lleida–Tarragona–Barcelona, Córdoba–Malaga, Madrid–Toledo, Madrid–Segovia–Valladolid, Madrid–Cuenca–Valencia) and another  were under construction. Opened in early 2013, the Perpignan–Barcelona high-speed rail line provides a link with neighbouring France with trains running to Paris, Lyon, Montpellier and Marseille.

Evolution in the United States

In 1992, the United States Congress passed the Amtrak Authorization and Development Act that authorized Amtrak to start working on service improvements on the segment between Boston and New York City of the Northeast Corridor. The primary objectives were to electrify the line north of New Haven, Connecticut, to eliminate grade crossings and replace the then 30-year-old Metroliners with new trains, so that the distance between Boston and New York City could be covered in 3 hours or less.

Amtrak started testing two trains, the Swedish X2000 and the German ICE 1, in the same year along its fully electrified segment between New York City and Washington DC. The officials favored the X2000 as it had a tilting mechanism. However, the Swedish manufacturer never bid on the contract as the burdensome United States railroad regulations required them to heavily modify the train resulting in added weight, among other things. Eventually, a custom-made tilting train derived from TGV, manufactured by Alstom and Bombardier, won the contract and was put into service in December 2000.

The new service was named "Acela Express" and linked Boston, New York City, Philadelphia, Baltimore, and Washington DC. The service did not meet the 3-hour travel time objective between Boston and New York City. The time was 3 hours and 24 minutes as it partially ran on regular lines, limiting its average speed, with a maximum speed of  being reached on a small section of its route through Rhode Island and Massachusetts.

As of November 2021, the U.S. has one high-speed rail line under construction (California High-Speed Rail) in California, and advanced planning by a company called Texas Central Railway in Texas, higher-speed rail projects in the Pacific Northwest, Midwest and Southeast, as well as upgrades on the high-speed Northeast Corridor. The private higher speed rail venture Brightline in Florida started operations along part of its route in early 2018.

Expansion in East Asia
For four decades from its opening in 1964, the Japanese Shinkansen was the only high-speed rail service outside of Europe. In the 2000s a number of new high-speed rail services started operating in East Asia.

Chinese CRH and CR 

High-speed rail was introduced to China in 2003 with the Qinhuangdao–Shenyang high-speed railway.
The Chinese government made high-speed rail construction a cornerstone of its economic stimulus program in order to combat the effects of the 2008 global financial crisis and the result has been a rapid development of the Chinese rail system into the world's most extensive high-speed rail network. By 2013 the system had  of operational track, accounting for about half of the world's total at the time.
Over 1,713 billion trips were made in 2017, more than half of China's total railway passenger delivery, making it the world's busiest network.

State planning for high-speed railway began in the early 1990s, and the country's first high-speed rail line, the Qinhuangdao–Shenyang Passenger Railway, was built in 1999 and opened to commercial operation in 2003. Planners also considered Germany's Transrapid maglev technology and built the Shanghai maglev train, which runs on a  track linking the Pudong, the city's financial district, and the Pudong International Airport.
Maglev, however, was not adopted nationally and all subsequent expansion features high-speed rail on conventional tracks.

In the 1990s, China's domestic train production industry designed and produced a series of high-speed train prototypes but few were used in commercial operation and none were mass-produced. The Chinese Ministry of Railways (MOR) then arranged for the purchase of foreign high-speed trains from French, German, and Japanese manufacturers along with certain technology transfers and joint ventures with domestic trainmakers. In 2007, the MOR introduced the China Railways High-speed (CRH) service, also known as "Harmony Trains", a version of the German Siemens Velaro high-speed train.

A collision of high-speed trains on 23 July 2011 in Zhejiang province killed 40 and injured 195, raising concerns about operational safety. A credit crunch later that year slowed the construction of new lines. But by 2012, the high-speed rail boom had renewed with new lines and new rolling stock by domestic producers that had indigenised foreign technology. On 26 December 2012, China opened the Beijing–Guangzhou–Shenzhen–Hong Kong high-speed railway, the world's longest high-speed rail line, which runs  from Beijing West railway station to Shenzhen North Railway Station.

South Korean KTX

In South Korea, Korea Train Express (KTX) services were launched on 1 April 2004, using French (TGV) technology, on the Seoul–Busan corridor, Korea's busiest traffic corridor, between the two largest cities. In 1982, it represented 65.8% of South Korea's population, a number that grew to 73.3% by 1995, along with 70% of freight traffic and 66% of passenger traffic. With both the Gyeongbu Expressway and Korail's Gyeongbu Line congested as of the late 1970s, the government saw the pressing need for another form of transportation.

Construction began on the high-speed line from Seoul to Busan in 1992 with the first commercial service launching in 2004. The initial rolling stock was based on Alstom's TGV Réseau, and was partly built in Korea. The domestically developed HSR-350x, which achieved  in tests, resulted in a second type of high-speed trains now operated by Korail, the KTX Sancheon. The next generation KTX train, HEMU-430X, achieved  in 2013, making South Korea the world's fourth country after France, Japan, and China to develop a high-speed train running on conventional rail above .

Taiwan HSR

While it contains only one line, its route covers Western Taiwan which resides over 90% of Taiwan's population; connecting most major cities of Taiwan: Taipei, New Taipei, Taoyuan, Hsinchu, Taichung, Chiayi, Tainan, and Kaohsiung. Once THSR began operations, almost all passengers switched from airlines flying parallel routes while road traffic was also reduced.

Middle East and Central Asia

Turkey

In 2009, Turkey inaugurated a high-speed service between Ankara and Eskişehir. This has been followed up by an Ankara – Konya route, and the Eskișehir line has been extended to Istanbul (Asian part).

Uzbekistan
The Talgo 250 service has been extended to Karshi as of August 2015 whereby the train travels  in 3 hours. As of August 2016, the train service was extended to Bukhara, and the  extension will take 3 hours and 20 minutes down from 7 hours.

Egypt 

, there are no operational high speed rail lines in Egypt. Plans have been announced for three lines, aiming to connect the Nile river valley, the Mediterranean coast, and the Red Sea. Construction had started on at least two lines.

Network

Maps

Technologies

Continuous welded rail is generally used to reduce track vibrations and misalignment. Almost all high-speed lines are electrically driven via overhead lines, have in-cab signalling, and use advanced switches using very low entry and frog angles.

Road-rail parallel layout

The road-rail parallel layout uses land beside highways for railway lines. Examples include Paris/Lyon and Köln–Frankfurt in which 15% and 70% of the track runs beside highways, respectively.

Track sharing

In Germany, some lines are shared with Inter-City and regional trains at day and freight trains at night.

Cost
The cost per kilometre in Spain was estimated at between €9 million (Madrid-Andalucía) and €22 million (Madrid-Valladolid). 
In Italy, the cost was between €24 million (Roma-Napoli) and €68 million (Bologna-Firenze).
In the 2010s, costs per kilometre in France ranged from €18 million (BLP Brittany) to €26 million (Sud Europe Atlantique). The World Bank estimated in 2019 that the Chinese HSR network was built at an average cost of $17–21 million per km, a third less of the cost in other countries.

At £309 million per mile, the UK's High Speed 2 line—currently under construction—is the most expensive high-speed line in the world as of 2020.

Freight high-speed rail 
All high-speed trains have been designed to carry passengers only. There are very few high-speed freight services in the world; they all use trains that were originally designed to carry passengers.

During the planning of the Tokaido Shinkansen, the Japanese National Railways were planning for freight services along the route. This plan was later discarded.

The French TGV La Poste was for a long time the sole very high-speed train service, transporting mail in France for La Poste at a maximum top speed of 270 km/h, between 1984 and 2015. The trainsets were either specifically adapted and built, either converted, passenger TGV Sud-Est trainsets.

In Italy, Mercitalia Fast is a high-speed freight service launched in October 2018 by Mercitalia. It uses converted passenger ETR 500 trainsets to carry goods at average speeds of 180 km/h, at first between Caserta and Bologna, with plans to extend the network throughout Italy.

In some countries, high-speed rail is integrated with courier services to provide fast door-to-door intercity deliveries. For example, China Railways has partnered with SF Express for high-speed cargo deliveries and Deutsche Bahn offers express deliveries within Germany as well as to some major cities outside the country on the ICE network. Rather than using dedicated freight trains, these use luggage racks and other unused space in passenger trains.

Rolling stock

Key technologies include tilting trainsets, aerodynamic designs (to reduce drag, lift, and noise), air brakes, regenerative braking, engine technology and dynamic weight shifting.

Comparison with other modes of transport

Optimal distance
While commercial high-speed trains have lower maximum speeds than jet aircraft, they offer shorter total trip times than air travel for short distances. They typically connect city centre rail stations to each other, while air transport connects airports that are typically farther from city centres.

High-speed rail (HSR) is best suited for journeys of 1 to 4½ hours (about ), for which the train can beat air and car trip time. European authorities treat HSR as competitive with passenger air for HSR trips under 4½ hours.

HSR eliminated most air transport from between Paris–Lyon, Paris–Brussels, Cologne–Frankfurt, Madrid–Barcelona, Naples–Rome–Milan, Nanjing–Wuhan, Chongqing–Chengdu, Tokyo–Nagoya, Tokyo–Sendai and Tokyo–Niigata.
China Southern Airlines, China's largest airline, expects the construction of China's high-speed railway network to impact (through increased competition and falling revenues) 25% of its route network in the coming years.

Market shares
TGV Sud-Est reduced the travel time Paris–Lyon from almost four to about two hours. Market share rose from 40 to 72%. Air and road market shares shrunk from 31 to 7% and from 29 to 21%, respectively. On the Madrid–Sevilla link, the AVE connection increased share from 16 to 52%; air traffic shrunk from 40 to 13%; road traffic from 44 to 36%, hence the rail market amounted to 80% of combined rail and air traffic. This figure increased to 89% in 2009, according to Spanish rail operator RENFE.

According to Peter Jorritsma, the rail market share s, as compared to planes, can be computed approximately as a function of the travelling time in minutes t by the logistic formula

According to this formula, a journey time of three hours yields a 65% market share, not taking into account any price differential in tickets.

In Japan, there is a so-called "4-hour wall" in high-speed rail's market share: If the high-speed rail journey time exceeds 4 hours, then people likely choose planes over high-speed rail. For instance, from Tokyo to Osaka, a 2h22m-journey by Shinkansen, high-speed rail has an 85% market share whereas planes have 15%. From Tokyo to Hiroshima, a 3h44m-journey by Shinkansen, high-speed rail has a 67% market share whereas planes have 33%. The situation is the reverse on the Tokyo to Fukuoka route where high-speed rail takes 4h47m and rail only has 10% market share and planes 90%.

In Taiwan, China Airlines cancelled all flights to Taichung Airport within a year of Taiwan high-speed rail starting operations. Completion of the high-speed railway in 2007 led to drastically fewer flights along the island's west coast, with flights between Taipei and Kaohsiung ceasing altogether in 2012.

Energy efficiency
Travel by rail is more competitive in areas of higher population density or where gasoline is expensive because conventional trains are more fuel-efficient than cars when ridership is high, similar to other forms of mass transit. Very few high-speed trains consume diesel or other fossil fuels but the power stations that provide electric trains with electricity can consume fossil fuels. In Japan (prior to the Fukushima Daiichi nuclear disaster) and France, with very extensive high-speed rail networks, a large proportion of electricity comes from nuclear power. On the Eurostar, which primarily runs off the French grid, emissions from traveling by train from London to Paris are 90% lower than by flying. In Germany 38.5% of all electricity was produced from renewable sources in 2017, however railways run on their own grid partially independent from the general grid and relying in part on dedicated power plants. Even using electricity generated from coal or oil, high-speed trains are significantly more fuel-efficient per passenger per kilometer traveled than the typical automobile because of economies of scale in generator technology and trains themselves, as well as lower air friction and rolling resistance at the same speed.

Automobiles and buses
High-speed rail can accommodate more passengers at far higher speeds than automobiles. Generally, the longer the journey, the better the time advantage of rail over the road if going to the same destination. However, high-speed rail can be competitive with cars on shorter distances, for example for commuting, especially if the car users do experience road congestion or expensive parking fees. In Norway, the Gardermoen Line has made the rail market share for passengers from Oslo to the airport (42 km) rise to 51% in 2014, compared to 17% for buses and 28% for private cars and taxis. On such short lines−particularly services which call at stations close to one another−the acceleration capabilities of the trains may be more important than their maximum speed.

Moreover, a typical passenger rail carries 2.83 times as many passengers per hour per meter width as a road. A typical capacity is the Eurostar, which provides capacity for 12 trains per hour and 800 passengers per train, totaling 9,600 passengers per hour in each direction. By contrast, the Highway Capacity Manual gives a maximum capacity of 2,250 passenger cars per hour per lane, excluding other vehicles, assuming an average vehicle occupancy of 1.57 people. A standard twin track railway has a typical capacity 13% greater than a 6-lane highway (3 lanes each way), while requiring only 40% of the land (1.0/3.0 versus 2.5/7.5 hectares per kilometre of direct/indirect land consumption). The Tokaido Shinkansen line in Japan, has a much higher ratio (with as many as 20,000 passengers per hour per direction). Similarly, commuter roads tend to carry fewer than 1.57 persons per vehicle (Washington State Department of Transportation, for instance, uses 1.2 persons per vehicle) during commute times.

Air travel

HSR Advantages
 Less boarding infrastructure: Although air transit moves at higher speeds than high-speed rail, total time to destination can be increased by travel to/from far out airports, check-in, baggage handling, security, and boarding, which may also increase cost to air travel.
 Short range advantages: Trains may be preferred in short to mid-range distances since rail stations are typically closer to urban centers than airports. Likewise, air travel needs longer distances to have a speed advantage after accounting for both processing time and transit to the airport.
 Urban centers: Particularly for dense city centers, short-hop air travel may not be ideal to serve these areas as airports tend to be far out of the city, due to land scarcity, short runway limitations, building heights, as well as airspace issues.
 Weather: Rail travel also requires less weather dependency than air travel. A well-designed and operated rail system can only be affected by severe weather conditions, such as heavy snow, heavy fog, and major storm. Flights however, often face cancellations or delays under less severe conditions.
 Comfort: High-speed trains also have comfort advantages, since train passengers are allowed to move freely about the train at any point in the journey. Since airlines have complicated calculations to try to minimise weight to save fuel or to allow takeoff at certain runway lengths, rail seats are also less subject to weight restrictions than on planes, and as such may have more padding and legroom. Technology advances such as continuously welded rail have minimised the vibration found on slower railways, while air travel remains affected by turbulence when adverse wind conditions arise. Trains can also accommodate intermediate stops at lower time and energetic costs than planes, though this applies less to HSR than to the slower conventional trains.
 Delays: On particular busy air-routes – those that HSR has historically been most successful on – trains are also less prone to delays due to congested airports, or in the case of China, airspace. A train that is late by a couple of minutes will not have to wait for another slot to open up, unlike airplanes at congested airports. Furthermore, many airlines see short-haul flights as increasingly uneconomic and in some countries airlines rely on high-speed rail instead of short-haul flights for connecting services.
 De-icing: HSR does not need to spend time deicing as planes do, which is time-consuming but critical; it can dent airline profitability as planes remain on the ground and pay airport fees by the hour, as well as take up parking space and contributing to congestive delays.
 Hot and High: Some airlines have cancelled or move their flights to takeoff at night due to hot and high conditions. Such is the case for Hainan Airlines in Las Vegas in 2017, which moved its long haul takeoff slot to after midnight. Similarly, Norwegian Air Shuttle cancelled all its Europe-bound flights during summer due to heat.  high-speed rail may complement airport operations during hot hours when takeoffs become uneconomical or otherwise problematic.
 Noise and pollution: Major airports are heavy polluters, downwind of LAX particulate pollution doubles, even accounting for Port of LA/Long Beach shipping and heavy freeway traffic. Trains may run on renewable energy, and electric trains produce no local pollution in critical urban areas at any rate. Noise also is an issue for residents.
 Ability to serve multiple stops: An airplane spends significant amounts of time loading and unloading cargo and/or passengers as well as landing, taxiing and starting again. Trains spend only a few minutes stopping at intermediate stations, often greatly enhancing the business case at little cost.
 Energy: high-speed trains are more fuel-efficient per passenger space offered than planes. Furthermore, they usually run on electricity, which can be produced from a wider range of sources than kerosene.

Disadvantages
 HSR usually requires land acquisition, for example in Fresno, USA where it was caught up in legal paperwork.
 HSR is subject to land subsidence, where expensive fixes sent costs soaring in Taiwan.
 HSR is affected by topography of the terrain as crossing mountain ranges or large bodies of water requires expensive tunnels and bridges.
 HSR is costly due to required specialized infrastructure as well as advanced technologies and multiple safety systems.
 The infrastructure is fixed hence the services provided are limited and can not be changed in response to changing market conditions. However, for passengers this can present an advantage as services are less likely to be withdrawn from railways compared to flight routes.
 As the infrastructure can be extremely expensive, it is not possible to create a direct route between every major city. This means that a train might be transiting or stopping in intermediate stations, increasing the length and duration of a journey.
 Railways require the security and cooperation of all geographies and governments involved.
 As all HSRs are electrified they require an extended electricity grid to supply the Overhead lines

Pollution
High-speed rail usually implements electric power and therefore its energy sources can be distant or renewable. This is an advantage over air travel, which currently uses fossil fuels and is a major source of pollution. Studies regarding busy airports such as LAX, have shown that over an area of about  downwind of the airport, where hundreds of thousands of people live or work, the particle number concentration was at least twice that of nearby urban areas, showing that airplane pollution far exceeded road pollution, even from heavy freeway traffic.

Trees
Airplanes and airstrips require trees to be cut down, as they are a nuisance to pilots. Some 3,000 trees will be chopped due to obstruction issues at Seattle–Tacoma International Airport. On the other hand, trees next to rail lines can often become a hazard during winter storms, with several German media calling for trees to be cut down following autumn storms in 2017.

Safety 
HSR is much simpler to control due to its predictable course. High-speed rail systems reduce (but do not eliminate) collisions with automobiles or people, by using non-grade level track and eliminating grade-level crossings. To date, the only two deadly accidents involving a high-speed train on high-speed tracks in revenue service were the 1998 Eschede train disaster and the 2011 Wenzhou train collision (in which speed was not a factor).

Accidents

In general, travel by high-speed rail has been demonstrated to be remarkably safe. The first high-speed rail network, the Japanese Shinkansen has not had any fatal accidents involving passengers since it began operating in 1964.

Notable major accidents involving high-speed trains include the following.

1998 Eschede accident

In 1998, after over thirty years of high-speed rail operations worldwide without fatal accidents, the Eschede accident occurred in Germany: a poorly designed ICE 1 wheel fractured at a speed of  near Eschede, resulting in the derailment and destruction of almost the entire set of 16 cars, and the deaths of 101 people. The derailment began at a switch; the accident was made worse when the derailed cars travelling at high speed struck and collapsed a road bridge located just past the switch.

2011 Wenzhou accident

On 23 July 2011, 13 years after the Eschede train accident, a Chinese CRH2 travelling at  collided with a CRH1 which was stopped on a viaduct in the suburbs of Wenzhou, Zhejiang province, China. The two trains derailed, and four cars fell off the viaduct. Forty people were killed and at least 192 were injured, 12 of them severely.

The disaster led to a number of changes in management and exploitation of high-speed rail in China. Despite the fact that speed itself was not a factor in the cause of the accident, one of the major changes was to further lower the maximum speeds in high-speed and higher-speed railways in China, the remaining  becoming 300,  becoming 200, and  becoming 160. Six years later they started to be restored to their original high speeds.

2013 Santiago de Compostela accident

The train derailed and overturned, resulting in 78 fatalities. Normally high-speed rail has automatic speed limiting restrictions, but this track section is a conventional section and in this case the automatic speed limit was said to be disabled by the driver several kilometers before the station. A few days later, the train worker's union claimed that the speed limiter didn't work properly because of lack of proper funding, acknowledging the budget cuts made by the current government. Two days after the accident, the driver was provisionally charged with homicide by negligence. This is the first accident that occurred with a Spanish high-speed train, but it occurred in a section that was not high speed and as mentioned safety equipment mandatory on high-speed track would have prevented the accident.

2015 Eckwersheim accident

On 14 November 2015, a specialised TGV EuroDuplex was performing commissioning tests on the unopened second phase of the LGV Est high-speed line in France, when it entered a curve, overturned, and struck the parapet of a bridge over the Marne–Rhine Canal. The rear power car came to a rest in the canal, while the remainder of the train came to a rest in the grassy median between the northern and southern tracks. Approximately 50 people were on board, consisting of SNCF technicians and, reportedly, some unauthorised guests. Eleven were killed and 37 were injured. Officials have indicated that excessive speed may have caused the accident. During testing, some safety features that usually prevent accidents like this one are switched off.

2018 Ankara train collision

On 13 December 2018, a high-speed passenger train and a locomotive collided near Yenimahalle in Ankara Province, Turkey. Three cars (carriages/coaches) of the passenger train derailed in the collision. Three railroad engineers and five passengers were killed at the scene, and 84 people were injured. Another injured passenger later died, and 34 passengers, including two in critical condition, were treated in several hospitals.

2020 Lodi derailment

On 6 February 2020, a high-speed train travelling at  derailed at Livraga, Lombardy, Italy. The two drivers were killed and 31 were injured. The cause as reported by investigators was that a faulty set of junction points was in the reverse position, but was reported by the signaling system as being in the normal - i.e. straight - position.

Ridership

High-speed rail ridership has been increasing rapidly since 2000. At the beginning of the century, the largest share of ridership was on the Japanese Shinkansen network.
In 2000, the Shinkansen was responsible for about 85% of the cumulative world ridership up to that point.
This has been progressively surpassed by the Chinese high-speed rail network, which has been the largest contributor of global ridership growth since its inception.
As of 2018, annual ridership of the Chinese high-speed rail network is over five times larger than that of the Shinkansen.

Records

Speed

There are several definitions of "maximum speed":
 The maximum speed at which a train is allowed to run by law or policy in daily service (MOR)
 The maximum speed at which an unmodified train is proved to be capable of running
 The maximum speed at which specially modified train is proved to be capable of running

Absolute speed record

Overall rail record 

Conventional rail 
Since the 1955 record, where France recorded a world record of speed of 331 km/h, France has nearly continuously held the absolute world speed record. The latest record is held by a TGV POS trainset, which reached  in 2007, on the newly constructed LGV Est high-speed line. This run was for proof of concept and engineering, not to test normal passenger service.

Maximum speed in service

, the fastest trains currently in commercial operation are :

 Shanghai Maglev :  (in China, on the lone  maglev track)
 CR400AF, CR400BF, CRH2C, CRH3C, CRH380A & AL, CRH380B, BL & CL, CRH380D :  (in China)
 TGV Duplex, TGV Réseau, TGV POS, TGV Euroduplex :  (in France)
 Eurostar e320 :  (in France and GB)
 E5 Series Shinkansen, E6 Series Shinkansen, H5 Series Shinkansen:  (in Japan)
 ICE 3 Class 403, 406, 407 :  (in Germany)
 AVE Class 103 :  (in Spain)
 KTX-I, KTX-II, KTX-III :  (in South Korea)
 AGV 575, ETR 1000 (Frecciarossa 1000):  (in Italy)
 ETR 500:  (in Italy)

Many of these trains and their networks are technically capable of higher speeds but they are capped out of economic and commercial considerations (cost of electricity, increased maintenance, resulting ticket price, etc.)

Levitation trains
The Shanghai Maglev Train reaches  during its daily service on its  dedicated line, holding the speed record for commercial train service.

Conventional rail

The second fastest operating conventional trains are the Chinese CR400A and CR400B running on Beijing–Shanghai HSR, after China relaunched its 350 km/h class service on select services effective 21 September 2017. In China, from July 2011 until September 2017, the maximum speed was officially , but a  tolerance was acceptable, and trains often reached .
Six years later they started to be restored to their original high speeds.

Service distance

The China Railway G403/4, G405/6 and D939/40 Beijing–Kunming train (10 hours 43 minutes to 14 hours 54 minutes), which began service on 28 December 2016, are the longest high-speed rail services in the world.

Existing high-speed rail systems by country and region

The early high-speed lines, built in France, Japan, Italy and Spain, were between pairs of large cities. In France, this was Paris–Lyon, in Japan, Tokyo–Osaka, in Italy, Rome-Florence, in Spain, Madrid–Seville (then Barcelona). In European and East Asian countries, dense networks of urban subways and railways provide connections with high-speed rail lines.

Central and East  Asia

China 

It is also the world's busiest with an annual ridership of over 1.44 billion in 2016 and 2.01 billion in 2018, more than 60% of total passenger rail volume. By the end of 2018, cumulative passengers delivered by high speed railway trains was reported to be over 9 billion.

The improved mobility and interconnectivity created by these new high-speed rail lines has generated a whole new high-speed commuter market around some urban areas.

Hong Kong 

A , entirely underground express rail link connects Hong Kong West Kowloon railway station near Kwun Chung to the border with Chinese mainland, where the railway continues onwards to Shenzhen's Futian station. A depot and the stabling sidings are located in Shek Kong. Commercial operations have been suspended since early 2020 due to the coronavirus outbreak. Parts of the West Kowloon station are no longer under the jurisdiction of Hong Kong to facilitate co-location of border clearance.

Indonesia 

Indonesia has one high-speed rail line under construction, the Jakarta–Bandung high-speed rail line, which will allow trains to reach up to 350 km/h.

Japan 

In Japan, the Shinkansen was the first bullet train and reaches a cumulative ridership of 6 billion passengers with zero passenger fatalities due to operational accidents (as of 2003), now it is second largest high speed rail in Asia.

South Korea 

Since its opening in 2004, KTX has transferred over 360 million passengers until April 2013, and now Asia's third largest. For any transportation involving travel above , the KTX secured a market share of 57% over other modes of transport, which is by far the largest.

Taiwan 

Taiwan has a single north–south high-speed line, Taiwan high-speed rail. The private company operates the line fully, and the system is based primarily on Japan's Shinkansen technology.

The line now has 12 total stations (Nangang, Taipei, Banqiao, Taoyuan, Hsinchu, Miaoli, Taichung, Changhua, Yunlin, Chiayi, Tainan and Zuoying) as of August 2018.

Uzbekistan 

Uzbekistan has a single high-speed rail line, the Tashkent–Samarkand high-speed rail line, which allows trains to reach up to 250 km/h. There are also electrified extensions at lower speeds to Bukhara and Dehkanabad.

Middle East and North Africa

Morocco 
In November 2007, the Moroccan government decided to undertake the construction of a high-speed rail line between the economic capital Casablanca and Tangier, one of the largest harbour cities on the Strait of Gibraltar. The line will also serve the capital Rabat and Kenitra. The first section of the line, Kenitra–Tangier high-speed rail line, was completed in 2018.

Saudi Arabia 
Plans in Saudi Arabia to begin service on a high-speed line consist of a phased opening starting with the route from Medina to King Abdullah Economic City followed up with the rest of the line to Mecca the following year. The Haramain high-speed railway opened in 2018.

Turkey 

The Turkish State Railways started building high-speed rail lines in 2003. The first section of the line, between Ankara and Eskişehir, was inaugurated on 13 March 2009. It is a part of the  Istanbul to Ankara high-speed rail line. A subsidiary of Turkish State Railways, Yüksek Hızlı Tren is the sole commercial operator of high-speed trains in Turkey.

The construction of three separate high-speed lines from Ankara to Istanbul, Konya and Sivas, as well as taking an Ankara–İzmir line to the launch stage, form part of the Turkish Ministry of Transport's strategic aims and targets. Turkey plans to construct a network of high-speed lines in the early part of the 21st century, targeting a  network of high-speed lines by 2013 and a  network by 2023.

Europe 

In Europe, several nations are interconnected with cross-border high-speed rail, such as London-Paris, Paris-Brussel-Rotterdam, Madrid-Perpignan, and other future connecting projects exist.

France 

Market segmentation has principally focused on the business travel market. The French original focus on business travellers is reflected by the early design of the TGV trains. Pleasure travel was a secondary market; now many of the French extensions connect with vacation beaches on the Atlantic and Mediterranean, as well as major amusement parks and also the ski resorts in France and Switzerland. Friday evenings are the peak time for TGVs (train à grande vitesse). The system lowered prices on long-distance travel to compete more effectively with air services, and as a result some cities within an hour of Paris by TGV have become commuter communities, increasing the market while restructuring land use.

On the Paris–Lyon service, the number of passengers grew sufficiently to justify the introduction of double-decker coaches. Later high-speed rail lines, such as the LGV Atlantique, the LGV Est, and most high-speed lines in France, were designed as feeder routes branching into conventional rail lines, serving a larger number of medium-sized cities.

Germany 

Germany's first high-speed lines ran north–south, for historical reasons, and later developed east–west after German unification. In the early 1900s, Germany became the first country to run a prototype electric train at speeds in excess of 200 km/h, and during the 1930s several steam and diesel trains achieved revenue speeds of 160 km/h in daily service. The InterCityExperimental briefly held the world speed record for a steel-wheel-on-steel-rails vehicle during the 1980s. The InterCityExpress entered revenue service in 1991 and serves purpose-built high-speed lines, upgraded legacy lines, and unmodified legacy lines. Lufthansa, Germany's flag carrier, has entered into a codeshare agreement with Deutsche Bahn where ICEs run as "feeder flights" bookable with a Lufthansa flight number under the AIRail program.

Italy 

During the 1920s and 1930s, Italy was one of the first countries to develop the technology for high-speed rail. The country constructed the Direttissime railways connecting major cities on dedicated electrified high-speed track (although at speeds lower to what today would be considered high-speed rail) and developed the fast ETR 200 trainset. After the Second World War and the fall of the fascist regime, interest in high-speed rail dwindled, with the successive governments considering it too costly and developing the tilting Pendolino, to run at medium-high speed (up to ) on conventional lines, instead. The only exception was the Direttissima between Florence and Rome, but it was not conceived to be part of a high-speed line on a large scale.

Frecciarossa services are operated with ETR 500 and ETR1000 non-tilting trains at 25kVAC, 50 Hz power.

Over 100 million passengers used the Frecciarossa from the service introduction up to the first months of 2012. The high-speed rail system serves about 20 billion passenger-km per year as of 2016.
Italian high-speed services are profitable without subsidies.

Nuovo Trasporto Viaggiatori, the world's first private open-access operator of high-speed rail, is operative in Italy since 2012.

Norway 

Some parts of the trunk railways around Oslo are renewed and built for :
 The Follo Line southwards from Oslo, a  line Oslo–Ski on the Østfold Line, mainly in tunnel, planned to be ready in 2021.
 The Holm–Holmestrand–Nykirke part of the Vestfold Line (west to southwest of Oslo).
 The Farriseidet project,  between Larvik and Porsgrunn on the Vestfold Line,  in tunnel.

Russia 

The existing Saint Petersburg–Moscow Railway can operate at maximum speeds of 250 km/h, and the Helsinki-Saint Petersburg railway capable of a maximum of 200 km/h.
Future areas include freight lines, such as the Trans-Siberian Railway in Russia, which would allow 3-day Far East to Europe service for freight, potentially fitting in between the months by ship and hours by air.

Spain 

It uses standard gauge as opposed to the Iberian gauge used in most of the national railway network, meaning that the high-speed tracks are separated and not shared with local trains or freight. Connections to the French network exist since 2013, with direct trains from Paris to Barcelona. Although on the French side, conventional speed tracks are used from Perpignan to Montpellier.

Switzerland 
High-speed north–south freight lines in Switzerland are under construction, avoiding slow mountainous truck traffic, and lowering labour costs. But the short high-speed parts and the mix with freight will lower the average speeds. The limited size of the country gives fairly short domestic travel times anyway. Switzerland is investing money in lines on French and German soil to enable better access to the high-speed rail networks of those countries from Switzerland.

United Kingdom 

The UK's fastest high-speed line (High Speed 1) connects London St Pancras with Brussels, Paris and Amsterdam through the Channel Tunnel.

North America

United States

The United States has domestic definitions for high-speed rail varying between jurisdictions.
 The United States Code defines high-speed rail as services "reasonably expected to reach sustained speeds of more than ",

Amtrak's Acela Express (reaching ), Northeast Regional, Keystone Service, Silver Star, Vermonter and certain MARC Penn Line express trains (the three reaching ) are currently the only high-speed services on the American continent, and all are limited to the Northeast Corridor. The Acela Express links Boston, New York City, Philadelphia, Baltimore, and Washington, D.C., and while Northeast Regional trains travel the whole of the same route, but make more station stops. All other high-speed rail services travel over portions of the route. The California High-Speed Rail project, eventually linking the 5 largest cities in California, is planned to have its first operating segment, between Merced and Bakersfield, in 2027.

Inter-city effects 
With high-speed rail there has been an increase in accessibility within cities. It allows for urban regeneration, accessibility in cities near and far, and efficient inter-city relationships. Better inter-city relationships lead to high-level services to companies, advanced technology, and marketing. The most important effect of HSR is the increase of accessibility due to shorter travel times. HSR lines have been used to create long-distance routes which in many cases cater to business travellers. However, there have also been short-distance routes that have revolutionised the concepts of HSR. They create commuting relationships between cities opening up more opportunities. Using both longer distance and shorter distance rail in one country allows for the best case of economic development, widening the labor and residential market of a metropolitan area and extending it to smaller cities. Therefore, HSR is highly related to urban development, it attracts offices and start-ups, induces industrial displacement, and promotes firm innovation.

Closures
The KTX Incheon International Airport to Seoul Line (operates on Incheon AREX) was closed in 2018, due to a mix of issues, including poor ridership and track sharing. The AREX was not constructed as high-speed rail, resulting a cap of 150 km/h on KTX service in its section.

In China, many conventional lines upgraded up to 200 km/h had high-speed services shifted to parallel high-speed lines. These lines, often passing through towns and having level crossings, are still used for local trains and freight trains. For example, all (passenger) EMU services on the Hankou–Danjiangkou railway were routed over the Wuhan–Shiyan high-speed railway on its opening to free up capacity for freight trains on the slower railway.

See also

 Ground effect train
 Railway speed record
 List of high-speed railway lines
 List of high-speed trains
 Maglev
 Megaproject
 Proposed high-speed rail by country
 Passenger rail terminology
 Vactrain
 Inter-city rail

References

Works cited

Further reading

External links

 World's fastest high-speed trains in commercial operation
 
 Progress with Railway Interoperability in the European Union 2013 Biennial Report

 
1964 establishments in Japan
Japanese inventions